The 1930 Davidson Wildcats football team represented Davidson College as an independent during the 1930 college football season. Led by eighth-year head coach William L. Younger, the Wildcats compiled an overall record of 6–4.

Schedule

References

Davidson
Davidson Wildcats football seasons
Davidson Wildcats football